The AMT Automag IV is a large, single action semi-automatic handgun. It was created by Harry Sanford, who also invented the original Automag. This model fires the .45 Winchester Magnum round; however until 1993 it was chambered for a time in 10mm Magnum. It has a 7- or 8-round magazine and is made of stainless steel.

See also
 AMT AutoMag II
 AMT AutoMag III
 AMT AutoMag V

References

External links
Website which presents detailed analyses of many types of weapon including the AMT automag

AMT semi-automatic pistols
Semi-auto magnum pistols